Dash (stylized as DASH) was a boutique clothing and accessory chain founded in 2006 by the Kardashian sisters (Kim Kardashian, Kourtney Kardashian and Khloé Kardashian). , the chain had three locations in the United States. As of April 2018, all locations have closed after 11 years of operation.

Stores

The first Dash boutique was opened in Calabasas, California in 2006. The original store was subsequently relocated to West Hollywood in 2012. The retail stores have appeared on reality television series about the Kardashian family, Keeping Up with the Kardashians, which premiered in 2007 on the E! cable network. Kim Kardashian has disclosed that she initially wanted Keeping Up with the Kardashians to focus more on their stores in order to bring people's attention and later said that she "didn't think it would turn into what it turned into."
The second store was opened in Miami Beach, Florida on May 20, 2009.

The third store was opened on November 3, 2010, in the SoHo district of Manhattan, New York City. In November 2010, TMZ reported that the store maintained to bring in an average gross of $50,000 every day since it's opening date; on Black Friday the store brought in over $100,000. The store closed in December 2016 due to high rent.

In the summer of 2014, the sisters opened a pop-up retail store in Southampton, New York, which was featured in Kourtney and Khloé Take The Hamptons, a spin off of Keeping up with the Kardashians.

Closure 
In April 2018, Kardashian-West announced the closure of all Dash stores via a statement through her website. She furthermore explained the reasoning behind the closure stating her and her sisters have all grown individually and have their own brands to focus on, along with being mothers.

Television series 
The television series entitled Dash Dolls premiered on the E! cable network, on September 20, 2015. The reality series "follow[s] the lives of the Kardashian sisters' young, fun and hot D-A-S-H boutiques employees as they navigate the hectic life of a twenty-something in Hollywood while representing the Kardashian brand."

References

External links 
Official website (Archive)

Clothing retailers of the United States
2000s fashion
Companies based in Los Angeles County, California
Retail companies established in 2006
Retail companies disestablished in 2018
Clothing companies established in 2006
Clothing companies disestablished in 2018
Kim Kardashian